Goseong Nam clan was one of the Korean clans. Their Bon-gwan was in Yeongyang County, North Gyeongsang Province. According to the research in 2015, the number of Goseong Nam clan was 10801. Nam Jin yong was a 7th descendant of  who was a civil servant in Tang dynasty.  was dispatched to Japan as an embassy but he had a shipwreck during the trip and then was naturalized in Silla.

See also 
 Korean clan names of foreign origin

References

External links 
 

 
Korean clan names of Chinese origin